The Simtek S941 is a Formula One car, designed by Nick Wirth and Paul Crooks for the Simtek team, and used during 1994 Formula One season. Although it was the first car to race under the Simtek name the company had previously designed an unbuilt car for BMW - the unbuilt design formed the basis of the Andrea Moda S921. Simtek also produced a design for Jean Mosnier's abortive Bravo S931 project which was to have launched in 1993. There is a strong family resemblance between the 1992 Andrea Moda and the 1994 Simtek.

Name and livery 

The S941 was driven by David Brabham for the whole season. Roland Ratzenberger was scheduled to drive the second car for the first five races, as he only had funding for the first part of the season, but his death at Imola the day before 3 time World Champion Ayrton Senna meant other drivers had to step in. Andrea Montermini was involved in a very serious accident at his very first race with the team in the Spanish Grand Prix practice session. This left the team in serious financial difficulties. For the remaining part of the year, three other drivers were in the second seat, including Jean-Marc Gounon, Domenico Schiattarella and Japanese pay driver Taki Inoue. Simtek's main sponsor was MTV. Other notable sponsors included Russell Athletic.

Engine 
The engine was a naturally aspirated V8 Ford HBD 6. It was underpowered, but only suffered three failures all season, all in David Brabham's car.

1994 season 

The team got the Simtek S941 home 12 times from 32 starts. They benefited from the slowness of the Simtek's back-of-the-grid rival Pacific PR01, which rarely qualified. The Simtek S941 did not score any points in its debut season; Jean-Marc Gounon marked the team's highest finish with ninth at the French Grand Prix, although he was four laps down on the leader.

Race results 
(key) (results in bold indicate pole position)

References

 (1994 season statistics.)

1994 Formula One season cars
Simtek Formula One cars